The Forbidden Rite is a 1962 Australian television play. It is a filmed ballet - the first ballet written in Australia exclusively for TV. The ABC did regularly broadcast ballet at the time.

It was a joint effort of producer, choreographer Rex Reid and composer Robert Hughes.

Plot
On a Mediterranean island, a tourist party inspects the ruins of a shrine built to the goddess of love.

Cast
Mary Duchensne as an English tourist
Victoria Biro as a village lass
Edward Miller as a village lad
Ron Paul as a tourist guide
Alida Glasbeck
Patrina Coates
Laurence Bishop
Barry Moreland

Production
The Forbidden Rite was composed by Robert Hughes, a music writer and arranger for the Victorian Symphony Orchestra. It is the first work commissioned for the Alfred Hill Memorial Award.  The ballet was choreographed by Rex Reid.

Reception
The Sydney Morning Herald called The Forbidden Rite "a triple success for composer Robert Hughes, producer William Sterling and choreographer Rex Reid" praising its "beautifully stylised sets and cameras working with machine-like precision."

The Bulletin said it "had its moments". The Age gave a mixed review.

References

External links
 

1962 television plays
Australian drama television films
1962 drama films
1962 films
Films directed by William Sterling (director)
1960s English-language films